712 is a 1991 album by the Japanese rock trio Shonen Knife. Using , "712" can be read as "na-i-fu", the Japanese imported word for "knife".

The Japanese re-issue of this CD does not include the song "Baggs" (co-written with members of L7), instead featuring a new song "Cooking Story".

Critical reception
AllMusic called the album "a recommended starting point for those wishing to indulge themselves in some whimsical and thoroughly unpretentious rock & roll." The New York Times wrote that "while [the band's] playing style can be charmingly imprecise -- harmonies that veer drastically out of key, missed drum cues -- its primitivism never seems contrived." Spin recommended the album, writing that Shonen Knife "triumph when they insert the referents of pop stardom into their own inimitable universe."

Track listing

Personnel

Shonen Knife
Naoko Yamano: vocals, guitars
Michie Nakatani: bass guitar, vocals
Atsuko Yamano: drums

Additional personnel
Jeff McDonald: vocals
Pat Fear, Atsushi Shibata: guitars
Noboru Yamada: saxophone
Dave Landry, Steve McDonald, Steve Davis: bass guitar
Victor Indrizzo: drums, percussion

References

Shonen Knife albums
1991 albums